Philadelphus incanus, the hairy mock orange, is a deciduous shrub in the genus Philadelphus.  Native to China, it is a medium to large shrub characterised by its hairy leaves and later flowering than other members of the genus.

References

The Hillier Manual of Trees and Shrubs, Ed. John Hillier, David & Charles 2007, 

incanus